Mangue, also known as Chorotega, is an extinct  Oto-Manguean language ancestral to Nicaragua, Honduras and Costa Rica. The ethnic population numbered around 10,000 in 1981. Chorotega-speaking peoples included the Mangue and Monimbo. The dialects were known as: Mangue proper in western Nicaragua, which was further subdivided into Dirian and Nagrandan; Choluteca in the region of Honduras' Bay of Fonseca; and Orotiña in Costa Rica's Nicoya Peninsula.

The Oto-Manguean languages are spoken mainly in Mexico and it is thought that the Mangue people moved south from Mexico together with the speakers of Subtiaba and Chiapanec well before the arrival of the Spaniards in the Americas. The timing of this migration is estimated to be between 800 and 1350 AD.

Some sources list "Choluteca" as an alternative name of the people and their language, and this has caused some (for example Terrence Kaufman 2001) to speculate that they were the original inhabitants of the city of Cholula, who were displaced with the arrival of Nahua people in central Mexico. The etymology for the nomenclature "Chorotega" in this case would come from the Nahuatl language where "Cholōltēcah" means "inhabitants of Cholula", or "people who have fled". The region of southernmost Honduras known as Choluteca, along with Choluteca City, derive their names from this Nahuatl word. Choluteca was originally inhabited by Chorotega groups. Daniel Garrison Brinton argued that the name chorotega was a Nahuatl exonym meaning "people who fled" given after a defeat by Nahuan forces that split the Chorotega-Mangue people into two groups. He argued that the better nomenclature was Mangue, derived from the group’s endonym mankeme meaning "lords".

In Guaitil, Costa Rica, the Mangue have been absorbed into the Costa Rican culture, losing their language, but pottery techniques and styles have been preserved.

Phonology

Consonants 

/t, k/ can have allophones [ts, tʃ].

Stop and fricative sounds /p, t, k, s/ can turn voiced [b, d, ɡ, z] after nasal sounds.

Vowels 
Three vowels are noted /a, i, u/. Allophones are also noted.

Phrases
Brinton gives a list of Mangue words and phrases some of which are:

The Verb "to be," 
I am, cejo. 
Thou art, simuh. 
He is, neje sumu. 
We are, cis mi muh.

Pronouns. 
saho. 
My, amba, mba. 
He, neje. 
She, neja.

Phrases. 
Koi murio, It is already dawn. 
Koi yujmi, It is already night. 
Koi prijpi, It is already growing dark. 
Susupusca? How are you?
Ko' mi muya''' i ku ? And you, how are you ?Camo cujmi umyaique, Nasi pujimo camo? There is nothing  new; and you, how are you ? Gusapo, Take a seatPami nyumuta, The food is goodRopia, Come hereUño I See I Mis upa'? Where are you going?Taspo, Yes.Tapame, Be good.

Brinton also compares the color terms of Mangue and Chiapanec:

Mangue. Chiapanec. 
Black, nanzome. dujamä. 
White, nandirime. dilimä. 
Yellow, nandiume. nandikumä. 
Blue or Green nandipame ndipamä 
Red, arimbome. nduimä

And a number of Nicaraguan and Costa Rican placenames that come from the Mangue language:
"Nindiria  (from ninda - shore, dirn, hill), Nakutiri (from naktu - fire, dirn, hill), Monimbe (ntimbu - water, rain), Nandasinmo (nanda - brook),  Mombonasi (nasi - woman), Masaya, Managua, Namotiva, Norome, Diriamba, Nicoya, Oretina"

Notes

References
 Kaufman, Terrence, (2001) Nawa linguistic prehistory, published at website of the Mesoamerican Language Documentation Project 
 Fabre, Alain, (2005) Diccionario etnolingüístico y guía bibliográfica de los pueblos indígenas sudamericanos: OTOMANGUE. McCallister, Rick. Mangue Chorotega , published on line in 2012 (80+ pages in PDF) (based on Quirós Rodríguez’s compilation with added toponyms, cultural terms, etc.)
 Constenla Umaña, Adolfo (Author). (1992). "The Languages of the Greater Nicoya". Costa Rican Languages Collection of Adolfo Constenla Umaña'' . The Archive of the Indigenous Languages of Latin America: www.ailla.utexas.org. Media: text. Access: public. Resource: MUL010R001. 

Oto-Manguean languages
Languages of Costa Rica
Languages of Honduras
Languages of Nicaragua
Extinct languages of North America